Soul Eater is a Japanese manga series written and illustrated by Atsushi Okubo. The series follows the adventures of three students at a school called the Death Weapon Meister Academy (or DWMA for short), known as meisters, who use demon weapon companions with human and weapon forms. These meisters, Maka Albarn, Black Star, and Death the Kid, seek to turn their weapons, Soul Eater, Tsubaki, and the Thompson sisters respectively, into "death scythes" for Lord Death, the Grim Reaper and head of the DWMA, by having their weapons consume the souls of 99 evil humans and one witch.

The manga initially began as three separate one-shots serialized between June 24, 2003 and November 26, 2003 in two manga magazines published by Square Enix. The first one-shot was published in the summer 2003 special edition of Gangan Powered, the second following in the autumn 2003 special edition of the same magazine, and the third serialized in Gangan Wing. The manga started regular serialization in Square Enix's Monthly Shōnen Gangan magazine on May 12, 2004. The first tankōbon was released by Square Enix under their Gangan Comics imprint on June 22, 2004 in Japan; as of December 12, 2013, 25 volumes have been released.

The series is published in English by Yen Press, and is serialized in Yen Press' Yen Plus manga anthology magazine. The first issue of Yen Plus was released on July 29, 2008. An anime adaptation of the manga, produced by Bones and Aniplex, aired on TV Tokyo between April 7, 2008 and March 30, 2009 and contained 51 episodes.

Volume list

See also

List of Soul Eater episodes
List of Soul Eater characters

References

External links
Official manga website  

Soul Eater
Chapters